The Malinnov M1P is a series of polymer-framed, short recoil-operated, double-action semi-automatic pistols designed and produced by Aegis Malinnov Sdn Bhd.

History
The design of this weapon involved research and development for four years with almost ten prototypes and each was  extensively tested. The basics of this weapon were originally from Glock and Beretta pistols and the company developed a sidearm with this M1P classification for reverse engineering.

The pistol is planned to be launched by 2017. It first appeared at the 2016 DSA convention. According to the local newspaper, The Star, it would be sold at RM4,000 each.

Variants
The M1P would consist of the following:

 Law Enforcement/Military Type
 Competitive Type

References

9mm Parabellum semi-automatic pistols
Police weapons
Weapons of Malaysia